Giuseppina Pasqualino di Marineo (9 December 1974 – 31 March 2008), known as Pippa Bacca, was an Italian performance and feminist artist.

On 31 March 2008, Pippa Bacca disappeared in Gebze in Turkey during an international hitchhiking trip to promote world peace under the motto, "marriage between different peoples and nations". Bacca and fellow artist Silvia Moro were symbolically wearing a wedding dress during their trek. On 11 April 2008 the police arrested a man who later confessed to her murder and led the authorities to the discovery of her body.

Biography
Pippa Bacca was born in Milan. Her father, Guido Pasqualino di Marineo, was originally from Naples. Her mother, Elena Manzoni, was the older sister of artist Piero Manzoni. Bacca worked with different media, including photography, collage and embroidery. Her 2004 piece Surgical Mutations consisted of a series of leaves collected in a wood and cut-out as to resemble different floral species. In 2006 she had her first institutional solo exhibition, The Broken Image at Fabbrica del Vapore in Milan.

"Brides on Tour"
In 2008 Bacca started working on a performative piece to promote world peace called "Brides on Tour," with fellow artist Silvia Moro. The artists, wearing white wedding dresses, departed from Milan on 8 March 2008, travelled through the Balkans and arrived in Turkey twelve days later. They had planned to hitchhike through the Middle East, their final destination being Jerusalem. Concerning their attire, they reported on their website that "That's the only dress we'll carry along — with all stains accumulated during the journey."

Disappearance
After travelling together across Europe, Bacca and Moro split up just prior to arriving in Istanbul, planning to meet up again in Beirut. Bacca was last seen on 31 March. Her credit card was reportedly used at noon of that day.

The man who led the police to her body, Murat Karataş, was detained and arrested after reportedly confessing to raping and strangling Bacca on 31 March after taking her in his Jeep from a gas station. DNA testing suggested that Bacca was raped by multiple people, and not just Karataş. The suspect said he was "under the influence of drugs and alcohol" and could not remember what happened. 

Karataş had been traced after he inserted his own SIM card into the victim's cell-phone - which alerted police, since he had a previous conviction for theft. Bacca's own information was wiped from the mobile device, implicating, according to the lawyer for Bacca's family, at least one other accomplice since Karataş could not speak English and left school after the third grade.

Aftermath
In the aftermath, Bacca's sister Maria gave a statement to the Italian news agency ANSA. "[Bacca's] travels were for an artistic performance and to give a message of peace and trust, but not everyone deserves trust... We weren't particularly worried because she had been hitchhiking for a long time, and thus was capable of avoiding risky situations... She was a determined person when it came to her art".

The Turkish president Abdullah Gül called the Italian president Giorgio Napolitano to express his grief. A commentary in Today's Zaman, while expressing sadness for the woman's death, criticized the supposed obsequiousness of Turkish politicians to "foreigners" in the Bacca case, writing: "Let's face it, if Pippa were a Turk, some people would feel free to say that a hitchhiking woman deserves to be raped." The columnist argued that local problems such as violence against women should be addressed regardless of Turkey's concern for being shamed before foreigners. Hürriyet, a top selling Turkish newspaper, printed an article on the murder entitled "We are ashamed". 

On the occasion of the 2009 Art Festival in Faenza, Istanbul Biennial director Fulya Erdemci made a public apology on behalf of her country. Bacca's fellow traveler Silvia Moro returned to Milan and stopped making art after the incident.

Tributes
A documentary about the story of Bacca, La Mariée (The Bride), was directed by the French filmmaker Joël Curtz in 2012. The film features video archives from Bacca's camera that the film team had been able to recover.

In 2020 the city of Milan dedicated to Bacca a public garden in the Brera district.

See also
 Frank Lenz, American adventurer who disappeared in Ottoman Turkey while cycling
 Kayla Mueller, American activist and aid worker abducted by ISIS and later killed
 List of solved missing person cases
 Murders of Louisa Vesterager Jespersen and Maren Ueland

Bibliography
Giorgio Bonomi, Martina Corgnati, Brides on Tour, Fondazione Mudima, Milan, and Byblos Art Gallery, Verona, 2009. 
Pippa Bacca, Eva e le altre, Cambi Editore, Poggibonsi, Italy, 2016.

References

External links
Official website

1974 births
2000s missing person cases
2008 deaths
Female murder victims
Feminist art
Feminist artists
Formerly missing people
Incidents of violence against women
Italian anti-war activists
Italian contemporary artists
Italian murder victims
Italian women artists
Missing person cases in Turkey
Pacifist feminists
People murdered in Turkey
Rape in Turkey
Violence against women in Turkey